Juarzon District is one of 16 districts of Sinoe County, Liberia. As of 2008, the population was 6,151.

References

 

Districts of Liberia
Sinoe County